Rommel Niño T. "KG" Canaleta (born February 12, 1982) is a Filipino professional basketball coach. He is currently the assistant coach for the Taichung Suns of the T1 League. He is also a former basketball player who played majority of his career in the Philippine Basketball Association (PBA). A 6-6 athletic forward, he is fondly called by nicknames like KG, The Big Ticket, and The Da Vinci of Dunk. He won the 2005, 2006, 2007, 2010 and 2012 PBA Slam Dunk Contests and led the Air21 Express to a third-place finish in the 2006 PBA Philippine Cup.

Professional career

PBA
He made a serious run for the Rookie of the Year honors with an impressive Philippine Cup campaign where he averaged 16.2 points per game, No. 1 among rookies and seventh in the tournament among locals. But a so-so performance in the Fiesta Conference and two finals stints of Red Bull made Larry Fonacier a no-brainer for the award.

Canaleta is undoubtedly one of the biggest attractions in the league with his jaw-dropping, never-seen slams by a local player. Canaleta was a back-to-back-to-back winner of the Slam Dunk competition, both by convincing fashion. He was ranked no. 2 in scoring among rookies during his rookie year with 9.4 points per outing. Canaleta was the first Philippine Basketball Association player to become a 5-time PBA Slam Dunk Champion. On 2011 PBA All-Star Weekend, he dunked on 3 men in the final round against Kelly Williams to win his 4th PBA Slam Dunk Champion Award. On 2012, Canaleta did it again after dunking on 3-men, including 6-foot-9 Asi Taulava to win his 5th Slam Dunk Award.

He was also awarded by the PBA to be the Mr. Quality Minutes Player in 2010.

On December 5, 2012, Canaleta scored a career-high 41 points in their 112-93 win against GlobalPort Batang Pier. Canaleta was named the PBA Press Corps' Player of the Week for the period April 8–14, 2013 after dropping 37 points anchored on 9-18 shooting from 3-point land in their come-from-behind win over Petron, 95-91.

On January 20, 2014, Canaleta was traded by Air21 to Talk 'N Text Tropang Texters for Sean Anthony, Eliud Poligrates, and a 2016 first-round pick.

On October 9, 2014, Canaleta was traded from Talk 'N Text to NLEX in a three-team trade that involved Blackwater Elite.

On August 25, 2015, Canaleta was traded by NLEX to Mahindra Enforcer in a three-team trade that also involved Talk 'N Text.

On March 29, Canaleta was traded to the Blackwater Elite in exchange for Dylan Ababou and James Forrester.

On January 10, 2018, while playing for the Meralco Bolts, Canaleta became the 87th member of the elite 5,000 points club, 83rd among locals, in the Bolts 103-98 loss to the Alaska Aces. 

On October 25, 2019, Canaleta, along with Mike Tolomia and two second round draft picks in 2020 and 2022, was traded to the Blackwater Elite for Allein Maliksi and Raymar Jose. This was his second stint with the Elite.

Taiwan
On March 19, 2022, Canaleta signed with Taichung Wagor Suns of the T1 League. On December 20, Canaleta signed with Taichung Suns of the T1 League as assistant coach. On December 23, Taichung Suns registered Canaleta as import player. On February 10, 2023, Taichung Suns cancelled the registration of Canaleta's playership.

PBA career statistics

As of the end of 2021 season

Season-by-season averages

|-
| align=left | 
| align="left" rowspan="3" | Air21
| 52 || 21.0 || .388 || .304 || .707 || 3.8 || .6 || .3 || .3 || 9.4
|-
| align=left | 
| 41 || 25.8 || .395 || .331 || .703 || 5.8 || .8 || .4 || .7 || 11.9
|-
| align=left | 
| 50 || 23.5 || .397 || .332 || .681 || 3.2 || 1.2 || .5 || .6 || 10.4
|-
| align=left | 
| align=left | Air21 / Purefoods
| 37 || 18.1 || .353 || .220 || .736 || 3.9 || .8 || .3 || .3 || 5.8
|-
| align=left | 
| align=left | Purefoods / B-Meg
| 58 || 17.5 || .379 || .345 || .596 || 2.6 || .9 || .3 || .4 || 8.1
|-
| align=left | 
| align=left | B-Meg / Air21
| 43 || 20.0 || .374 || .342 || .804 || 3.7 || .5 || .4 || .5 || 8.0
|-
| align=left | 
| align=left | Barangay Ginebra
| 36 || 17.2 || .413 || .364 || .739 || 3.3 || .7 || .2 || .3 || 8.7
|-
| align=left | 
| align=left | Air21
| 39 || 30.6 || .397 || .369 || .739 || 5.3 || 1.3 || .5 || .6 || 16.7
|-
| align=left | 
| align=left | Air21 / Talk 'N Text
| 48 || 23.8 || .388 || .351 || .769 || 4.1 || .7 || .5 || .2 || 10.2
|-
| align=left | 
| align=left | NLEX
| 36 || 20.1 || .382 || .327 || .762 || 3.3 || .6 || .2 || .1 || 8.1
|-
| align=left | 
| align=left | Mahindra
| 32 || 25.3 || .425 || .354 || .841 || 3.8 || 1.0 || .2 || .4 || 11.7
|-
| align=left | 
| align=left | GlobalPort / Blackwater
| 36 || 23.5 || .372 || .347 || .745 || 4.1 || .9 || .4 || .4 || 8.4
|-
| align=left | 
| align=left | Meralco
| 37 || 19.4 || .394 || .374 || .722 || 3.7 || 1.0 || .2 || .3 || 8.6
|-
| align=left | 
| align=left | Meralco / Blackwater
| 25 || 12.7 || .436 || .429 || .833 || 2.0 || .9 || .2 || .2 || 6.6
|-
| align=left | 
| align="left" rowspan="2" | Blackwater
| 11 || 25.4 || .398 || .347 || .765 || 4.3 || .7 || .2 || .5 || 11.7
|-
| align=left | 
| 13 || 16.0 || .306 || .190 || .727 || 2.2 || .6 || .2 || .6 || 4.6
|-class=sortbottom
| align=center colspan=2 | Career
| 594 || 21.4 || .390 || .341 || .723 || 3.7 || .8 || .3 || .4 || 9.5

Awards
 Mr. Quality Minutes Award (2010)
 Five-time PBA Slam Dunk Champion (2005, 2006, 2007, 2010, 2012)
 PBA All Rookie First Team (2005–2006)
 Scored a record 38 Points in the PBA Rookie Game
 2013 PBA Most Improved Player

References

1982 births
Living people
Air21 Express players
Barako Bull Energy draft picks
Barako Bull Energy players
Barangay Ginebra San Miguel players
Basketball players from Tarlac
Blackwater Bossing players
FIBA 3x3 World Tour players
Filipino expatriate basketball people in Taiwan
Filipino men's 3x3 basketball players
Filipino men's basketball players
Filipino people of African-American descent
Ilocano people
Kapampangan people
Magnolia Hotshots players
Meralco Bolts players
NLEX Road Warriors players
NorthPort Batang Pier players
People from Tarlac City
Philippine Basketball Association All-Stars
Power forwards (basketball)
Small forwards
Taichung Wagor Suns players
T1 League Asian imports
Terrafirma Dyip players
TNT Tropang Giga players
UE Red Warriors basketball players
Taichung Suns coaches
Filipino men's basketball coaches
Taichung Suns players
T1 League imports